This page lists all described species of the spider family Ischnothelidae accepted by the World Spider Catalog :

Andethele

Andethele Coyle, 1995
 A. huanca Coyle, 1995 (type) — Peru
 A. lucma Coyle, 1995 — Peru
 A. tarma Coyle, 1995 — Peru

Indothele

Indothele Coyle, 1995
 I. dumicola (Pocock, 1900) (type) — India
 I. lanka Coyle, 1995 — Sri Lanka
 I. mala Coyle, 1995 — India
 I. rothi Coyle, 1995 — India

Ischnothele

Ischnothele Ausserer, 1875
 I. annulata Tullgren, 1905 — Brazil, Bolivia, Paraguay, Argentina
 I. caudata Ausserer, 1875 (type) — Mexico to Brazil
 I. digitata (O. Pickard-Cambridge, 1892) — Mexico to El Salvador
 I. garcia Coyle, 1995 — Hispaniola
 I. goloboffi Coyle, 1995 — Peru
 I. guianensis (Walckenaer, 1837) — Peru to Guyana
 I. huambisa Coyle, 1995 — Peru
 I. indicola Tikader, 1969 — India
 I. jeremie Coyle, 1995 — Hispaniola
 I. longicauda Franganillo, 1930 — Bahama Is., Cuba
 I. reggae Coyle & Meigs, 1990 — Jamaica
 I. xera Coyle & Meigs, 1990 — Jamaica

Lathrothele

Lathrothele Benoit, 1965
 L. catamita (Simon, 1907) — São Tomé and Príncipe
 L. cavernicola Benoit, 1965 — Congo
 L. grabensis Benoit, 1965 (type) — Cameroon, Congo, Rwanda, Burundi
 L. jezequeli Benoit, 1965 — Ivory Coast
 L. mitonae Bäckstam, Drolshagen & Seiter, 2013 — Gabon

Thelechoris

Thelechoris Karsch, 1881
 T. rutenbergi Karsch, 1881 (type) — Madagascar
 T. striatipes (Simon, 1889) — East, Southern Africa, Madagascar

References

Lists of spider species by family
Mygalomorphae